Sifri Khatun was a Seljuk princess, daughter of sultan Alp Arslan (r. 1063–1072), sister of Malik Shah (r. 1072–1092) and the first wife of Abbasid caliph al-Muqtadi (r. 1075–1094).

Biography
One of Alp Arslan's wives was Safariyya Khatun. She had a daughter, Sifri Khatun. Her mother, Safariyya died in Isfahan in 1073–4.

Sifri Khatun in 1071–72, married Abbasid caliph Al-Muqtadi. In 1071–72 the grandfather of al-Muqtadi, Al-Qa'im sent his vazir Ibn Al-Jahir to ask her hand in marriage, to which demand the Sultan agreed. She married Abdallah ibn Muhammad (future Al-Muqtadi) and the marriage was consummated shortly after the marriage.

This marriage was politically important for the caliph because it gives him a power over Seljuk territories. As the ruling caliph was also related to ruling Seljuk sultan though marriage. However, Her father, Alp Arslan died shortly after her marriage in 1072 and her husband al-Muqtadi married another Seljuk princess decade later. 

Al-Muqtadi's second wife was Mah-i Mulk Khatun, daughter of Sultan Malik-Shah I. In March 1082, Al-Muqtadi sent Abu Nasr ibn Jahir to Malik Shah in Isfahan to ask for her hand in marriage. Her father gave his consent and the marriage contract was concluded. She arrived Baghdad in March 1087. The marriage was consummated in May, 1087. She gave birth to Prince Ja'far on 31 January 1088. This second marriage also proved beneficial to al-Muqtadi political power as it made al-Muqtadi both the brother-in-law and son-in-law of Malik-Shah.

Even though Sifri Khatun remained as the first wife of al-Muqtadi, she didn't remained influential as her niece Mah-i-Mulk Khatun because Mah-i-Mulk was the daughter of ruling sultan.

References

Sources
 El-Hibri, T. (2021). The Abbasid Caliphate: A History. Cambridge University Press.
 
 al-Sāʿī, Ibn; Toorawa, Shawkat M.; Bray, Julia (2017). كتاب جهات الأئمة الخلفاء من الحرائر والإماء المسمى نساء الخلفاء: Women and the Court of Baghdad. Library of Arabic Literature. NYU Press.

Seljuk dynasty
11th-century Turkic people
Turkic female royalty
Wives of Abbasid caliphs